Ashoknagar may refer to:

Places 
 Ashok Nagar (Delhi)
 Ashoknagar (Madhya Pradesh)
 Ashoknagar (West Bengal)
 Ashok Nagar, Allahabad, Uttar Pradesh
 Ashok Nagar, Chennai
 Ashok Nagar, Eluru, West Bengal
 Ashok Nagar, Hyderabad, Telangana
 Ashok Nagar, Mumbai, Maharashtra
 Ashok Nagar Ajmer, Rajasthan
 Ashoknagar district, Madhya Pradesh
 Ashok Nagar Pokhriya, Begusarai District, Bihar
 Ashoknagar tehsil, Madhya Pradesh

Constituencies 
 Ashok Nagar (Vidhan Sabha constituency), Madhya Pradesh
 Ashoknagar (Vidhan Sabha constituency), West Bengal

Transport 
 Ashok Nagar metro station, Chennai
 Ashoknagar railway station, Madhya Pradesh
 Ashoknagar Road railway station, West Bengal